Uridine diphospho-N-acetylglucosamine:polypeptide beta-N-acetylglucosaminyltransferase may refer to:
 Protein O-GlcNAc transferase, an enzyme
 Protein N-acetylglucosaminyltransferase, an enzyme